The 200 metres hurdles is a rarely run hurdling event in track and field competitions. Sometimes, this event is referred to as the low hurdles. It was run twice in the Summer Olympics, in 1900 and 1904.

All-time top 25
straight = performance on straight track
y = 220 yard course
h = hand timing
A = affected by altitude

Men
Correct as of September 2021.

Notes
Below is a list of other times equal or superior to 22.50:
Don Styron also ran 22.1  (1960, 1961), 22.2  (1960, 1961), 22.3  (1960, 1961).
Andy Turner also ran 22.30 (2010).
Ancel Robinson also ran 22.3  (1957).

Women
Correct as of September 2021.

Notes

Below is a list of other times equal or superior to 26.16:
Meghan Beesley also ran 25.28 (2015).
Pam Kilborn-Ryan also ran hand-timed 25.8 (1969), 25.9 (1971), 26.0 (1969) and 26.1 (1969).
Patricia Girard also ran 25.82 (1999), hand-timed 26.1 (1998) and 26.11 (1998).
Ebony Morrison also ran 25.83 straight (2021).
Shamier Little also ran 25.88 straight (2019), 25.90 straight (2018) and 26.00 straight (2017).
Yadisleidy Pedroso also ran hand-timed 25.7 (2012) and 26.06 (2015).
Rhonda Whyte also ran 26.05 straight (2019).
Valeria Bufanu also ran a hand-timed 26.1 (1970).
Teresa Sukniewicz also ran a hand-timed 26.1 (1970).
Cassandra Tate also ran 26.15 straight (2018).

Masters athletics
The event is the official distance for the M80+ and W70+ divisions of Masters athletics.  The height for all hurdles in these age groups is 27" (69 cm) and arrangement of the hurdles is different from the previous version.  The distance to the first hurdle is 20 metres, which corresponds with the markings for the last half of a 400 metres hurdle race, standard on most tracks.  Because, like the flat 200 metres, the race only covers half a standard track, a wind reading is required.

27-inch hurdles
The idea of using 27-inch (68.6 cm) hurdles was introduced in Europe in 2000. The increment does not exist on standard hurdles, which caused resistance from some NGBs, but the rules were adopted worldwide.  Many modern hurdles will not go to that height or would at least require modification to cut the hurdle.  Most facilities that have spent thousands of dollars to buy regulation hurdles would certainly not let their hurdles be damaged like this. Since it is a requirement, major championship meets have purchased a few sets of modern modified hurdles, which then creates the logistical problem of shipping these few hurdles between meets in order for the competitors to have an opportunity to race over proper hurdles. As a substitute, many older hurdle designs are easier to modify to get to the proper height and most facilities are less protective of the old, rusty hurdles in the junk pile. Also many training hurdles (used to teach smaller, youth beginners) will go to 27 inches and lower.

Records
After setting the world record for the 300 metres hurdles during its last year on the official program at age 80, at age 81, Canadian Earl Fee set the still standing world record of 36.95 (+0.0) at the NCCWMA Regional Championships in Mayaguez, Puerto Rico on September 5, 2010.  Almost four years later, Fee also set the M85 record of 42.70 (+0.4) in the same meet, this time being held in San Jose, Costa Rica on August 23, 2014.  The M90 record of 51.31 was set a month earlier by American Ralph Maxwell with the benefit of high altitude in Fort Collins, Colorado, USA at the Rocky Mountain Masters Games.

Australian Marge Allison holds the W70 record of 36.71 (+0.7), set August 12, 2015 in Lyon, France, at the 2015 World Masters Athletics Championships.  Allison also holds the W65 record set four years earlier at the same championships.  Canadian Christa Bortignon set the W75 record of 39.89 (+0.0) at a domestic meet in Kamloops, British Columbia on May 18, 2013.  American sprinting legend Irene Obera learned hurdles sufficiently to set the W80 record 42.24 (+1.2) on July 20, 2014, at the USATF Masters Championships in Winston-Salem, North Carolina.

References

Events in track and field
Hurdling